AKC may refer to:

 American Kennel Club, registry of purebred dog pedigrees in the United States
 Associate of King's College, an award of King's College London since 1833
 Ananda Kentish Coomaraswamy (1877−1947), Ceylonese philosopher and metaphysician